The West Indies cricket team toured Sri Lanka in October/November 2015 to play two Tests, three One Day Internationals (ODIs) and two Twenty20 International (T20I) matches. Starting with this series, all bilateral Test tours between the West Indies and Sri Lanka will be called the Sobers–Tissera Trophy. Sri Lanka won the Test series 2–0, the ODI series 3–0 with the T20I series was drawn 1–1.

The whole series was rain affected and the play was interrupted on numerous occasions. All three matches in the ODI series were rain interrupted and the results were all determined by the Duckworth–Lewis–Stern method.

The second T20I match, which was originally scheduled to be held on 12 November 2015 was rescheduled and was held on 11 November at the R Premadasa Stadium, after discussions with the relevant Cricket Boards of the two nations. The T20I was rescheduled as 12 November was declared a national day of mourning by the government, due to the death of Venerable Maduluwawe Sobitha Thero, with Thero's funeral being held on the 12th. Also, there was a minute of silence prior to the match and the Sri Lankan cricketers wore a yellow band on their arms as a gesture of respect.

Squads

West Indies bowler Samuel Badree was ruled out of the T20I series after contracting dengue fever. He was replaced by Devendra Bishoo.

Tour matches

Tour match: Sri Lanka Board President's XI vs West Indians

One day: Sri Lanka Board President's XI vs West Indians

Test series (Sobers-Tissera Trophy)

1st Test

2nd Test

ODI series

1st ODI

2nd ODI

3rd ODI

T20I series

1st T20I

2nd T20I

References

External links
 Series Home at ESPNCricinfo

2016 in Sri Lankan cricket
2016 in West Indian cricket
International cricket competitions in 2015–16
West Indian cricket tours of Sri Lanka